Michele Strazzabosco (born February 6, 1976) is an Italian former ice hockey defenseman. He played for two decades in the top Italian ice hockey league (Serie A) and was a member of the Italian national ice hockey team for a dozen years, including at the 2006 Winter Olympics in Turin. Strazzabosco is considered one of the top native players in Italian ice hockey history.

Serie A
Strazzabosco debuted in Italy's Serie A at the age of 17 in the 1993–94 season, playing for his hometown Asiago HC. He played there for 12 seasons before joining the H.C.J. Milano Vipers in 2005–06.

In the 2008–09 season, Strazzabosco joined Sportivi Ghiaccio Cortina. He went back to Asiago HC the following season, where he played until retiring at the end of the 2014–15 season.

He played in 793 games in Italy's top league during his career, tallying 68 goals and adding 211 assists. He also played in 89 playoff games, scoring 9 goals and 23 assists.

During his career, Strazzabosco was part of five Italian league championships for his hometown team, in addition to a championship with Milano. He also participated in three IIHF Continental Cup tournaments with Asiago HC, including a third-place finish in 2013–14.

National Hockey League
At the age of 30, Strazzabosco was offered a tryout from the National Hockey League's Buffalo Sabres prior to the 2006–07 NHL season. On September 19, he became the first Italian-trained player to appear in an NHL preseason game. Wearing No. 24 and paired with Sabres defenseman Michael Funk, Strazzabosco played just over 13 minutes in the game, a 4–1 loss to the Columbus Blue Jackets. He spent two minutes in the penalty box for a hooking call.

Strazzabosco and Italian goaltender Thomas Tragust, who participated in the Sabres' developmental camp, had been recommended to Buffalo by goalie coach Jim Corsi and scout Jon Christiano. Corsi had been an assistant coach for the Italian national team during the 2006 Olympics, while Christiano was an assistant for Italy at that year's World Championships. According to Corsi, Strazzabosco had also attracted interest from the Detroit Red Wings and Vancouver Canucks.

Buffalo Sabres general manager Darcy Regier, however, opted not to sign Strazzabosco to a contract for either Buffalo or their American Hockey League affiliate, the Rochester Americans. During his time with the Sabres organization, Strazzabosco said team co-captain Chris Drury was one of his biggest influences.

International
Stazzabosco represented Italy at the highest level internationally in 170 games from 1998 to 2010, including 12 World Championships and the 2006 Winter Olympics, which the nation hosted. He also played in two European Junior Championships and three World Junior Championships.

In the 2006 IIHF World Championship, he scored a game-tying goal in Italy's final match, against Slovenia, that saved the team from being relegated. Another memorable goal came when he scored against the Canadian team in the 2010 IIHF World Championship.

Strazzabosco was expected to be part of Italy's team at the 2011 IIHF World Championship; however, he was removed from the team's roster along with two Asiago teammates (Enrico Miglioranzi and Federico Benetti) after they missed a training session following a late-night party celebrating Asiago's league championship.

Personal
Following his playing career, Strazzabosco became a commentator for Asiago HC's streaming platform, Asiago.TV.

Career statistics

Regular season and playoffs

International

References

External links

1976 births
Living people
Asiago Hockey 1935 players
HC Milano players
Ice hockey players at the 2006 Winter Olympics
Italian ice hockey defencemen
Olympic ice hockey players of Italy
People from Asiago
SG Cortina players
Sportspeople from the Province of Vicenza